Belousovo is a town in Zhukovsky District of Kaluga Oblast, Russia. Population:

History
Town status was granted to Belousovo on December 29, 2004.

Administrative and municipal status
Within the framework of administrative divisions, Belousovo is subordinated to Zhukovsky District. As a municipal division, the town of Belousovo is incorporated within Zhukovsky Municipal District as Belousovo Urban Settlement.

References

Notes

Sources

External links
Official website of Belousovo 
Belousovo Business Directory 

Cities and towns in Kaluga Oblast